Sir Henry Dutton Colt, 1st Baronet (–1731), of St. James's, Westminster, was an English politician.

He was a Member (MP) for Newport, Isle of Wight in the period 2 December 1695 – 1698 and for Westminster in December 1701 – 1702 and 1705–1708. He was the first of the Colt baronets.

References

1646 births
1731 deaths
Baronets in the Baronetage of England
Members of Parliament for Newport (Isle of Wight)
People from Westminster
English MPs 1695–1698
English MPs 1701–1702
English MPs 1705–1707
British MPs 1707–1708